Darlingside is a four-person indie folk band from Boston, MA. The band consists of Don Mitchell, Auyon Mukharji, Harris Paseltiner, and David Senft. Their style has been described as “exquisitely-arranged, literary-minded, baroque folk-pop” by All Songs Considered. Their latest full-length album, Fish Pond Fish, was released in October 2020.

History 
 
Darlingside began as a five-piece touring Indie rock band in the fall of 2009. Members (Sam, Don, Auyon, Harris, and David) met as undergraduates while attending Williams College in Williamstown, MA. A previous iteration of the band existed while they were students and included as many as seven members (other members were Eli Walker, Dan Wollin, and Shea Chen).
 
In 2010, the band went on their first national tour and released a self-produced six-track studio EP, EP 1. They released their debut full-length album, Pilot Machines, in 2012, which was recorded and co-produced by Nathaniel Kunkel (who has worked with Sting, Lyle Lovett, Graham Nash). Writing about Pilot Machines, David Fricke of Rolling Stone praises the band as having “a rich line in acoustic textures and chamber-rock dynamics.”

After Kapala's departure from the band in 2013, Darlingside moved toward a traditional bluegrass set-up (notable because they do not play bluegrass) with all four remaining musicians clustered around a single condenser microphone. Following additional national tours translating their indie-rock songs into quartet arrangements, Darlingside released their second full-length album, Birds Say, in September 2015. After headlining across New England on a regional release tour, they further promoted the album on a national tour supporting Grammy Award-winner Patty Griffin at sold-out venues such as the Ryman and Fillmore theaters. Birds Say received critical acclaim from NPR (“exquisitely-arranged, literary-minded, baroque folk-pop”), Rolling Stone (“A ‘must-see’ act...locomotive folk-pop confections so richly executed it's hard to tell if it's one voice or 12”), and The New Yorker (“Sometimes the sunshine breaks out in their harmonies and it feels like 1965 with David Crosby and the Byrds”).
 
In 2016, Folk Alliance International named Darlingside “Artist of the Year.” In October of the same year, Darlingside released its second EP, Whippoorwill. In 2018 the band performed at the Vancouver Folk Music Festival.

In October 2021, the band wrote and performed the song "Helping Others", the ninth of 11 tracks created for the Big Hearts World program for Nickelodeon's Noggin SVOD channel which ran from late March-December 2021, with the learning program's soundtrack releasing in September and animation produced at Made by Radio.

Band Name 

The band's name originates from a songwriting class taken by the band members at Williams College. The course instructor, Bernice Lewis, quoted British writer Sir Arthur Quiller-Couch in teaching the class to “kill your darlings.” Lewis applied this philosophy to songwriting, wherein a favorite line, lick, or riff (“a darling”) might compromise the balance and arc of the song as a whole. The name “Darlingside” is an homage to “killing one’s darlings.” It is spelled with an “s” instead of a “c” (like regicide, fratricide, or homicide) because the band felt the “s” is easier on the eye.

Discography 
 EP 1 (2010)
 Pilot Machines (2012)
 Woodstock (with Heather Maloney) (2014)
 Birds Say (2015)
 Whippoorwill (2016)
 Extralife (2018)
 Look Up & Fly Away (2019)
 Instrumentals Vol. 1 (2020)
 Fish Pond Fish (2020)

References

External links 
 Official website
 Official Youtube Channel
 Official Vimeo Channel
 Twitter
 Instagram

Musical groups from Boston
American indie folk groups
Thirty Tigers artists